Old Heidelberg is a 1959 West German drama film directed by Ernst Marischka and starring Christian Wolff, Gert Fröbe and Sabine Sinjen. It is an adaptation of the 1901 play Old Heidelberg by Wilhelm Meyer-Förster.

It was shot at the Spandau Studios in Berlin with sets designed by the art directors Hertha Hareiter and Otto Pischinger.

Cast

References

Bibliography

External links

1959 films
1959 romantic drama films
German romantic drama films
West German films
1950s German-language films
German films based on plays
Films set in Heidelberg
Films set in the 1900s
Films about princes
Sound film remakes of silent films
Remakes of American films
Films shot at Spandau Studios
1950s German films